Mark Brown is a paralympic athlete from Great Britain competing mainly in category T46 long-distance events. He has also represented Gibraltar.

Mark Brown was born in 1962 or 1963 in Burnley, England.

Brown competed at three Paralympics. In the 1996 Summer Paralympics he combined the 5000m and marathon, winning a bronze medal in the T42-46 marathon.  In the 2000 Summer Paralympics he concentrated on the marathon where he won a silver in the T46 class and in the 2004 Summer Paralympics he concentrated on the 5000m but did not win a medal.

In 2002 Brown moved to Gibraltar to live with his brother and his family and to work as a mental health nurse. In 2006 he competed in the World Road Running Championships, representing Gibraltar.

References

Paralympic athletes of Great Britain
Athletes (track and field) at the 2000 Summer Paralympics
Athletes (track and field) at the 2004 Summer Paralympics
Paralympic silver medalists for Great Britain
Paralympic bronze medalists for Great Britain
Gibraltarian male athletes
Living people
Year of birth missing (living people)
Medalists at the 1996 Summer Paralympics
Long-distance runners with limb difference
Marathon runners with limb difference
British male long-distance runners
British male marathon runners
Medalists at the 2000 Summer Paralympics
Medalists at the 2004 Summer Paralympics
Paralympic medalists in athletics (track and field)
Paralympic long-distance runners
Paralympic marathon runners